Trikomo (Turkish: Yeni İskele) is a town in North-Eastern Mesaoria in Cyprus. It is under the de facto control of Northern Cyprus and is the administrative center of the İskele District of Northern Cyprus. It gained municipality status in 1998.

History 
Prior to the Turkish invasion of Cyprus of 1974, the population of Trikomo consisted almost entirely of Greek Cypriots, most of whom fled during the conflict and some of whom were later transported to the south. In 1974, Turkish Cypriots from the Skala neighbourhood of Larnaca ("İskele" in Turkish) settled in the village, giving it its new name (lit. "New İskele", later shortened to İskele).

Turkish Cypriot Larnaca Municipality that was founded in 1958 moved to Trikomo in 1974.

Culture, sports, and tourism
Turkish Cypriot Larnaka Gençler Birliği or İskele Gençlerbirliği Sports Club was founded in 1934 in Larnaca, and as of the 2018-19 season plays in the KTFF Süper Lig.

Trikomo contains the Panagia Theotokos Church, which hosts an icon museum showcasing rare examples of medieval iconography in Cyprus. The church is a twin church consisting of Orthodox and Catholic sections. Its older Catholic section dates to the Byzantine era while the Catholic section was built in the 12th century during the Lusignan period.

The town also annually hosts the İskele Festival, which takes place for ten days in the summer, and is the oldest annual festival in Cyprus, first held in Larnaca in 1968. In 1974, the festival was moved to Trikomo along with the move of the Turkish Cypriot inhabitants. It features an international folk dance festival, concerts by Turkish Cypriot and mainland Turkish musicians, various sports tournaments, food stalls and competitions, as well as other shows and contests highlighting the cultural heritage of the town.

Politics 
The current mayor of the town is Hasan Sadıkoğlu. Sadıkoğlu was elected in 2014 as an independent candidate. He was elected once more in 2018 as the candidate of the right-wing National Unity Party (UBP), winning with 54.6% of the votes. In the local elections of 2018, four members of the UBP, two members of the pro-settler Rebirth Party (YDP) and two members of the left-wing Republican Turkish Party (CTP) were elected to the eight-member municipal council.

International relations

Twin towns — sister cities
Trikomo is twinned with:

 Beykoz, Istanbul, Turkey
 Büyükçekmece, Istanbul, Turkey
 Finike, Antalya, Turkey (since 2015)
 Mamak, Ankara, Turkey
 Pendik, Istanbul, Turkey
 Samsun, Turkey (since 2006)

Notable people
Vassos Karagiorgis (b. 1929), archaeologist.
Georgios Grivas (1898-1974), general in the Greek Army, leader of the EOKA guerrilla organisation and EOKA B paramilitary organisation.

References

Communities in Famagusta District
Populated places in İskele District
Municipalities of Northern Cyprus